Althausite is a relatively simple magnesium phosphate mineral with formula Mg2(PO4)(OH,F). It is very rare. Original occurrences are magnesite deposits among serpentinites. It is named after Egon Althaus (born 1933), a mineralogist at the University of Karlsruhe, Germany.

References

Magnesium minerals
Phosphate minerals
Orthorhombic minerals
Minerals in space group 62